Maggie Brown (born 1948)  is an American playwright, director and actress.

Education
Maggie Brown was raised in Independence, Missouri, and graduated from Southwest Missouri State University. After moving to New York City, she worked in theater as a performer with Time & Space, Ltd. theatre company, and as Director of Children's Theatre at the Manhattan Theatre Club. As an acting teacher, she taught at the New York Association for the Blind, where she directed several Lighthouse Players productions, including The Little Foxes.

Work
On television, she performed guest roles on series including Barney Miller, Dallas, Highway to Heaven and Little House on the Prairie, and appeared in more than 250 television commercials.

Her first script, Sophisticated Nuts and Dried Fruit (1982), was produced in Los Angeles as three one-act plays, and staged in 2001 at Eastern Connecticut State University. Kenn Salmon and herself are co-authors of plays: Pat the Cat's Last Fling (1990) and Country Songbird with Wife.

As of 2011 and since writing Twelve Angry Jurors, Brown has performed with The Old Pros Theatre Group, a troupe of retired actors, musicians and dancers who stage productions for the Laguna Woods Village retirement community in Laguna Woods, California.

References

External links

American stage actresses
American television actresses
American theatre directors
1948 births
Living people
Actresses from Missouri
Writers from Independence, Missouri
American women dramatists and playwrights
20th-century American actresses
20th-century American dramatists and playwrights
20th-century American women writers
21st-century American actresses
21st-century American dramatists and playwrights
21st-century American women writers
Women theatre directors
Missouri State University alumni